Steilacoom High School (or SHS) is a public high school in Steilacoom, Washington, United States and is part of the Steilacoom Historical School District. It is the oldest, and to date the only, high school in the school district. Prior to its establishment, students attended grades 9–12 in the neighboring Tacoma School District and Clover Park School District. SHS was established in 1981 for grades 9 and 10, with grades 11 and 12 starting in the following two years.  The facility underwent a $23 million modernization and expansion in 2007–09.

Communities in the district include: Steilacoom, Anderson Island, DuPont, Ketron Island, and portions of Lakewood and University Place.

Athletics
SHS offers a variety of seasonal sports:
 Fall: Boys Cross Country, Girls Cross Country, Boys Golf, Girls Golf, Football, Girls Soccer, Girls Swim, Boys Tennis, Volleyball
 Winter: Boys Basketball, Girls Basketball, Boys Swim, Boys Wrestling, Girls Wrestling, Girls Bowling
 Spring: Baseball, Softball, Girls Tennis, Boys Soccer, Boys Track, Girls Track

Notable alumni
 Cody Balogh, former American football offensive lineman
  Emeka Egbuka, American college football wide receiver

References

External links
 

Public high schools in Washington (state)
High schools in Pierce County, Washington